Deoleo, S.A. is a Spanish multinational olive oil processing company. It is the world's largest bottler selling brands such as Bertolli, Carapelli, Carbonell, and Koipe.
In India, it sells olive oil under brand name Figaro.

Legal 
Some controversy emerged in 2010 when Bertolli Extra Virgin Olive Oil was identified as one of the olive oils mislabeled as extra virgin in a study by University of California, Davis.

In May 2014, a complaint was filed by 7 persons in the United States District Court "against Deoleo, USA and Med Foods, Inc", two subsidiaries of Deoleo, S.A.

In 2018, Deoleo agreed to pay a $7 million settlement to resolve a class-action lawsuit that had alleged that the company had misrepresented Bertolli olive oil, and committed to undertake several actions to correct such misrepresentation. The suit alleged that it was misleading for Bertolli to advertize its olive oil as being "Imported from Italy" when the oils actually came from olives grown and pressed in Greece, Chile, Spain, Australia, Turkey, and Tunisia, and had merely been mixed and bottled in Italy. Deoleo removed the phrase "Imported from Italy" from its products and committed not to use similar phrasing in the future unless the oil is derived entirely from olives grown and pressed in Italy. Additionally, the suit alleged that the clear bottles used by Bertolli for its oil were inadequate to protect them from sunlight and temperature extremes, such that the olive oil would not meet the "extra virgin" quality standard by the time it reached consumers. As part of the settlement, Deoleo implemented several new practices to help ensure that its oil would meet the "extra virgin" standard at the time of sale and use: using dark green bottles to protect its extra virgin olive oil from photooxidation; implementing stricter testing protocols; disclosing the date on which the olives used to make the oil were harvested on the bottle; and shortening “best by” period indicated on the bottle.

On 17 January 2020, the management decides to carry out the ACORDEON effect through which the shares become worth 0 Euros to be able to correct part of the debt leaving retailers without investments or savings, leaving practically the majority of small investors with losses, to avoid catastrophic management, debts and avoid bankruptcy.

Brands

References

External links
Official
Official website
Bertolli
Carapelli
Carbonell

Financial
Deoleo, S.A. — Comisión Nacional del Mercado de Valores
Deoleo, S.A. — Hoover's

Food and drink companies established in 1955
Companies of Andalusia
Spanish brands
Olive oil
Spanish companies established in 1955